Nilanga Assembly constituency is one of six assembly constituencies in the Latur (Lok Sabha constituency). Since 2008, this assembly constituency is numbered 238 amongst 288 constituencies.

After the delimitation commission, the Nilanga Assembly Constituency was attached to Latur.
In the Nilanga Assembly constituency, the Indian National Congress party is the strongest party.

Members of Assembly

Election results

General elections 2014

References
 https://web.archive.org/web/20110815140153/http://electionaffairs.com/results/State_assembly/Maharashtra_2009/maharashtra_assembly_results_2009i.html

Assembly constituencies of Latur district
Latur
Assembly constituencies of Maharashtra